The Climb (1997), republished as The Climb: Tragic Ambitions on Everest, is an account by Russian-Kazakhstani mountaineer Anatoli Boukreev of the 1996 Everest Disaster, during which eight climbers died on the mountain. The co-author, G. Weston DeWalt—who was not part of the expedition—provides accounts from other climbers and ties together the narrative of Boukreev's logbook.

Background
The book is also partially a response to Jon Krakauer's account of the same 1996 Everest climb in his book Into Thin Air (1997), which appeared to criticize some of Boukreev's actions during the climb.

After The Climb was published, DeWalt leveled many public criticisms at Krakauer concerning the accuracy of each man's account of what happened on the mountain during the 1996 climbs. Krakauer details the disagreements, and his rapprochement with Boukreev , in the postscript to the 1999 edition of Into Thin Air.

Boukreev was killed in 1997 in an avalanche with Dimitri Sobolev during a winter ascent of Annapurna in Nepal.

Reception
A reviewer of Publishers Weekly commented "Like Into Thin Air, Jon Krakauer's bestselling chronicle of the same expedition, this account is a gripping account of the Mountain Madness group's bid to reach the top of the world's highest peak, one that combines Boukreev's firsthand recollections and DeWalt's interviews with team members. But Boukreev and DeWalt, a freelance journalist, also offer a look at the mundane tasks associated with climbing, such as obtaining the necessary permits and equipment, and taking the reader through the complex preparations required to scale the mountain, including the establishment of various camps and the acclimatization process required for climbers to adjust to higher altitudes".

A reviewer of Kirkus Reviews stated "Mountain guide Boukreev tells his version of the events of the May 1996 Mt. Everest disaster, in which five climbers died, in an effort to clear his name of damning allegations made in Jon Krakauer's bestselling Into Thin Air. Boukreev is well known in climbing circles as a good, tough, experienced guide, not especially personable or given to pampering the clients, but utterly reliable, especially in tight situations".

Neal Beidleman, Boukreev's fellow guide on the expedition, called the book "a dishonest account of the May tragedy" and pointed out that DeWalt never contacted him to fact-check a single detail.

See also

Books and films about the 1996 Everest Disaster
After the Wind (2014), a book by Lou Kasischke.
Left for Dead: My Journey Home from Everest (2000), a book by Beck Weathers
Into Thin Air: Death on Everest (1997), a TV movie.
Everest (1998), an IMAX documentary film.
Everest (2015), a feature film.
Into Thin Air, a book by Jon Krakauer

Other similar movies
Vertical Limit

Lists
List of media related to Mount Everest
List of people who died climbing Mount Everest

Notes

1997 non-fiction books
Mountaineering books
Mount Everest in fiction
Collaborative non-fiction books